The 1979 FINA Men's Water Polo World Cup was the first edition of the event, organised by the world's governing body in aquatics, the International Swimming Federation (FINA). The event took place in Rijeka and in the Tašmajdan Swimming Pool in Belgrade, Yugoslavia.

Participating teams were the eight best teams from the last World Championships in Berlin, West Germany (1978). The teams played a round robin to decide the first ever winner of what would be a bi-annual event until 1999.

Results Matrix

Final standings

Final ranking

References

FINA Water Polo World Cup
F
W
International water polo competitions hosted by Yugoslavia